London Business School may refer to the following:

 London Business School, a constituent college of University of London
 City, University of London Business School, formerly known as CASS Business School
 London School of Business and Finance